Matnema is a rural locality (a village) in Tarasovskoye Rural Settlement of Plesetsky District, Arkhangelsk Oblast, Russia. The population was 15 as of 2010.

Geography 
Matnema is located 99 km east of Plesetsk (the district's administrative centre) by road. Kurka Gora is the nearest rural locality.

References 

Rural localities in Plesetsky District